The 2009 European Ladies' Team Championship took place 7–11 July at Bled Golf & Country Club in Bled, Slovenia. It was the 27th women's golf amateur European Ladies' Team Championship.

Venue 
The hosting King's Course at Bled Golf & Country Club, the oldest golf course in Slovenia, located 2 kilometers east of Bled, was built in 1937 in varied and diverse terrains, on the initiative of the Yugoslav royal family. It was re-designed in 1972 by golf architect Donald Harradine.

The championship course was set up with par 73.

Format 
All participating teams played two qualification rounds of stroke-play with six players, counted the five best scores for each team.

The eight best teams formed flight A, in knock-out match-play over the next three days. The teams were seeded based on their positions after the stroke-play. The first placed team was drawn to play the quarter final against the eight placed team, the second against the seventh, the third against the sixth and the fourth against the fifth. In each match between two nation teams, two 18-hole foursome games and five 18-hole single games were played. Teams were allowed to switch players during the team matches, selecting other players in to the afternoon single games after the morning foursome games. Teams knocked out after the quarter finals played one foursome game and four single games in each of their remaining matches. Games all square after 18 holes were declared halved, if the team match was already decided.

The seven teams placed 9–15 in the qualification stroke-play formed flight B, to play similar knock-out match-play, with one foursome game and four single games, to decide their final positions.

The three teams placed 16–18 in the qualification stroke-play formed flight C, to meet each other, with one foursome game and four single games, to decide their final positions.

Teams 
18 nation teams contested the event. Each team consisted of six players.

Players in the teams

Winners 
Team France lead  the opening 36-hole qualifying competition, with a score of 3 over par 733, two strokes ahead of defending champions team Sweden.

Individual leaders in the 36-hole stroke-play competition was Carlota Ciganda, Spain and Marieke Nivard, Netherlands, each with a score of 7 under par 139, one stroke ahead of Lucie André, France..

Team Germany won the championship, beating England 4–3 in the final and earned their first title.

Team France earned third place, beating  Spain 4–3 in the bronze match.

Results 

Qualification round

Team standings

* Note: In the event of a tie the order was determined by the better total non-counting scores.

Individual leaders

 Note: There was no official award for the lowest individual score.

Flight A

Bracket

Final games

Flight B

Bracket

Flight C

Team matches

Final standings

Sources:

See also 
 Espirito Santo Trophy – biennial world amateur team golf championship for women organized by the International Golf Federation.
 European Amateur Team Championship – European amateur team golf championship for men organised by the European Golf Association.
 European Ladies Amateur Championship – European amateur individual golf championship for women organised by the European Golf Association.

References

External links 
 European Golf Association: Results

European Ladies' Team Championship
Golf tournaments in Slovenia
European Ladies' Team Championship
European Ladies' Team Championship
European Ladies' Team Championship